Heindel is a surname. Notable people with the surname include:

Max Heindel (1865–1919), Danish-American Christian occultist, astrologer, and mystic
Ned D. Heindel (born 1937), American chemist
Robert Heindel (1938–2005), American painter, illustrator, and stage designer

See also
Heindl